Chemawa was an unincorporated community north of Salem, Oregon, in Marion County in the United States. Chemawa was also the name of a station on the Southern Pacific railroad, originally the Oregon Electric Railway. Chemawa Indian School was named after the Chemawa post office at this locale.

References

External links

Geography of Salem, Oregon
Unincorporated communities in Marion County, Oregon
Unincorporated communities in Oregon
Oregon placenames of Native American origin